Luke Lowden (born 22 February 1991) is a former professional Australian rules footballer who played for the Hawthorn Football Club in the Australian Football League (AFL). He was also listed with the Adelaide Football Club without playing a senior match. He was recruited by Hawthorn with pick 63 in the 2008 national draft from the Sandringham Dragons.

Early life
Lowden's family moved from Sydney to Cosgrove, Victoria, near Shepparton, when he was 12. He played junior football for the Dookie United Football Club before moving to Melbourne to attend Caulfield Grammar School. He played in three TAC Cup games for the Sandringham Dragons in 2008, which led to him being drafted.

AFL career

Hawthorn (2009–2014)
Lowden did not play for Hawthorn in his first few seasons, instead playing for their VFL affiliate side, Box Hill. Lowden began in Box Hill's reserves and was promoted to their senior side in 2010. He played in a premiership with Box Hill in 2013. Lowden finally made his AFL debut in round 12 of the 2014 season, against , and kicked three goals playing as a ruckman opposed to Dean Cox and Nic Naitanui. Despite his strong performance Lowden did not play another AFL game for the season, and at the end of the season sought greater opportunities at another club.

Adelaide (2015–2016)
Lowden suffered an Achilles injury in the 2015 pre-season that delayed his start to the season. He recovered to play 13 matches for Adelaide's reserves team in the SANFL, kicking 15 goals as a key forward with occasional stints in the ruck. He was delisted at the conclusion of the 2016 season.

Statistics

|- style=background:#EAEAEA
| 2009 ||  || 38
| 0 || — || — || — || — || — || — || — || — || — || — || — || — || — || — || — || — || 0
|-
| 2010 ||  || 38
| 0 || — || — || — || — || — || — || — || — || — || — || — || — || — || — || — || — || 0
|- style=background:#EAEAEA
| 2011 ||  || 30
| 0 || — || — || — || — || — || — || — || — || — || — || — || — || — || — || — || — || 0
|-
| 2012 ||  || 30
| 0 || — || — || — || — || — || — || — || — || — || — || — || — || — || — || — || — || 0
|- style=background:#EAEAEA
| 2013 ||  || 30
| 0 || — || — || — || — || — || — || — || — || — || — || — || — || — || — || — || — || 0
|-
| 2014 ||  || 30
| 1 || 3 || 0 || 6 || 6 || 12 || 0 || 2 || 15 || 3.0 || 0.0 || 6.0 || 6.0 || 12.0 || 0.0 || 2.0 || 15.0 || 0
|- style=background:#EAEAEA
| 2015 ||  || 40
| 0 || — || — || — || — || — || — || — || — || — || — || — || — || — || — || — || — || 0
|-
| 2016 ||  || 40
| 0 || — || — || — || — || — || — || — || — || — || — || — || — || — || — || — || — ||0
|- class="sortbottom"
! colspan=3| Career
! 1 !! 3 !! 0 !! 6 !! 6 !! 12 !! 0 !! 2 !! 15 !! 3.0 !! 0.0 !! 6.0 !! 6.0 !! 12.0 !! 0.0 !! 2.0 !! 15.0 !! 0
|}

Honours and achievements
Team
 VFL premiership player: 2013

References

External links

Living people
1991 births
Hawthorn Football Club players
Box Hill Football Club players
Australian rules footballers from Victoria (Australia)
Sandringham Dragons players
People educated at Caulfield Grammar School
Shepparton Football Club players
Adelaide Football Club (SANFL) players